Suanzes may refer to:

Places

Suanzes (Madrid Metro), a station on Line 5

People

Daniel Varela Suanzes-Carpegna (born 1951), Spanish politician
Juan Antonio Suanzes (1891–1977), Spanish soldier and engineer